A Life by Design?  is the only studio album by American hard rock band Fight or Flight, released on July 23, 2013. The debut single, "First of the Last", was released on May 7, 2013, with its radio airplay beginning on May 21, 2013.

Track listing

Charts

References 

2013 albums
Fight or Flight (band) albums